The siege of Santa Maura took place on 21 July – 6 August 1684 between the forces of the Republic of Venice and the Ottoman Empire, and was the opening battle of the Sixth Ottoman–Venetian War.

From his base at Corfu the Venetian commander-in-chief, Francesco Morosini, led a fleet of 38 galleys, 8 galleasses and several auxiliary vessels (many of them provided by the Greeks of the Ionian Islands) to besiege the Fortress of Santa Maura on the island of Lefkada (also known as Santa Maura), that was under Ottoman rule. The besieging forces were swelled by Greek levies and volunteers from the Ionian Islands. The siege lasted until 6 August, when the commander Bekir Agha, bowing to pressure from the 500 Albanians and 200 Greeks in the fortress garrison, surrendered to the Greco-Venetian noble Angelo Delladecima.

References 

1684 in Europe
1684 in the Ottoman Empire
Conflicts in 1684
Santa Maura 1684
Lefkada
Santa Maura 1684
Santa Maura 1684
17th century in Greece